Louis-François Dunière (July 11, 1754 – August 29, 1828) was a businessman and political figure in Lower Canada.

He was born in the town of Quebec in 1754, the son of Louis Dunière. Dunière was elected to the Legislative Assembly of Lower Canada for Hertford in 1796, after his father retired from politics. As his father had in the 1792 assembly, Louis-François proposed Jean-Antoine Panet as speaker. Dunière settled at Berthier. He was a justice of the peace and served as major in the local militia during the War of 1812.

He died in Pointe-du-Lac in 1828.

External links
 

1754 births
1828 deaths
Pre-Confederation Quebec people
Members of the Legislative Assembly of Lower Canada
Canadian justices of the peace